Arturia compacta is a species of calcareous sponge in the family Clathrinidae found in Mauritius. This species is very likely to be synonymous with Arthuria canariensis, differing only in its larger and thicker triactines. However, the type and only known specimen is lost.

References

World Register of Marine Species entry

Clathrina
Sponges described in 1877
Fauna of Mauritius